Paul Bismarck Tabinas (born 5 July 2002) is a professional footballer who plays as a defender for Vukovar 1991 in Prva nogometna liga. Born in Japan, he plays for the Philippines national team.

Club career

Iwate Grulla Morioka
Tabinas scored his first goal for Iwate Grulla Morioka in a 13–0 Emperor's Cup win over Oyama SC.

He was terminated contract due to drink drive.

International career
Born in Japan to a Ghanaian father and a Filipino mother, Tabinas is eligible to present, Ghana or Philippines at international level.
He is not eligible for Japanese international team due Japanese local rule.

Philippines
In December 2022, he made his debut for the Philippines  in a 1–0 friendly defeat against Vietnam.

Personal life
Born in Japan, Tabinas is of Ghanaian and Filipino descent. He is the younger brother of fellow professional footballer Jefferson Tabinas.

Career statistics

Club
.

Notes

References

2002 births
Living people
People from Shinjuku
Filipino footballers
Philippines international footballers
Japanese footballers
Filipino people of Ghanaian descent
Japanese people of Filipino descent
Japanese people of Ghanaian descent
Sportspeople of Ghanaian descent
Association football defenders
J3 League players
Iwate Grulla Morioka players